Democracies: Patterns of Majoritarian and Consensus Government in Twenty-one Countries is a work of comparative politics by the political scientist Arend Lijphart.  The book was first published in 1984 by Yale University Press.

References

Footnotes

Bibliography

1984 non-fiction books
Political books
Yale University Press books